Shalom Gorewitz (born 1949) is an American visual artist. Gorewitz was among the first generation of artists who used early video technology as an expressive medium. Since the late 1960s, he has created videos  that "transform recorded reality through an expressionistic manipulation of images and sound". His artworks often "confront the political conflicts, personal losses, and spiritual rituals of contemporary life". Gorewitz has also made documentary videos.

Gorewitz’s videos have been exhibited and screened at festivals, galleries and museums worldwide. His work is in the permanent collections of the Whitney Museum, New York; the Museum of Modern Art, New York; Museo Nacional Centro de Arte Reina Sofia, Madrid; Zentrum fur Kunst und Medientechnologie Karlsruhe, Germany; Itau Cultural Center, São Paulo, Brazil; Kowasaki Museum, Tokyo; the Library of the California Institute of the Arts, Valencia; The New York Public Library; and the Getty Museum Video Art Archive, Los Angeles.

Gorewitz was awarded a Guggenheim Fellowship in Video and Audio in 1989 and has received grants from the National Endowment for the Arts, the Asian Cultural Foundation, and Arts America. He has received two Fulbright Senior Specialist fellowships to conduct research and teach at the Kwame Nkrumah University of Science and Technology in Kumasi, Ghana where he is also an adjunct professor in Visual Arts and Animation. Gorewitz has been a professor of Video and New Media at Ramapo College of New Jersey since 1981.

Education 
Gorewitz graduated from the California Institute of the Arts with a B.F.A. in 1971. He was a student of the pioneering video artist Nam June Paik, and of Alison Knowles, Gene Youngblood, and Allan Kaprow, among others. Gorewitz received an M.F.A. from Antioch International University in 1986.

Career

Early years 
Following graduation, Gorewitz worked as a Video Associate for the dancer and choreographer Daniel Nagrin. Gorewitz collaborated with Nagrin to create the official video recordings of Steps, (1972) and The Edge is Also a Circle, (1973). During these years, while pursuing his own creative projects, Gorewitz was the video art columnist for Changes in the Arts magazine. His contributions included early coverage of Shirley Clarke’s T. P. Videospace Troupe’s traveling video workshop.

RASTER 
In 1978, Gorewitz conceived of and produced RASTER, one of the first programs dedicated to video art on cable television. Shown on New York’s public access cable channel, the weekly program presented the artist’s own abstract videos as well as interviews and collaborations with other artists and actors. Because experimental video was a new visual form, RASTER opened with a message from Gorewitz reassuring viewers that while they might be seeing something “unusual”, what was on the screen would “neither harm them nor their [television set].”

From 1977 to 1981, Gorewitz was a guest curator at The Kitchen in New York City, organizing exhibitions, panels, and screenings highlighting video art as well as "work being done by artists with prototype and often homemade analog and early digital computers". Founded by video artists Steina and Woody Vesulka, The Kitchen became a respected site for exhibitions of video and media art.

Experimental Television Center 
Gorewitz was a resident artist at the Experimental Television Center from 1977 to 1993. In 2015, Gorewitz’s work was included in a retrospective exhibition on the history of the ETC, which was considered "one of North America’s preeminent organizations for video art, fostering a community for creativity and innovation through its residency and tool-building programs" for over forty years.

Night Flight 
Videos by Gorewitz were presented on the USA Network’s television series Night Flight. A re-edit of the artist’s 1982 video US Sweat became the regular "sign-off" for the program.

Bronx Museum and Blue Swee 
From 1983 to 85, Gorewitz was an artist in residence at the Bronx Museum of the Arts. Throughout these years he collected images and audio for his video Blue Swee: Some Thoughts on the US Invasion of Grenada. Working with students and artists in the Bronx, Gorewitz notes,

Select and noteworthy exhibitions 
Early exhibitions by the artist include Jerusalem Calling (1972), commissioned by New York’s Jewish Museum; the multimedia exhibition featured a multi-channel audio installation by Gorewitz. In 1979, video works by Gorewitz were exhibited at New York City’s White Columns (originally named 112 Workshop), the Hal Bromm Gallery, and in 1983 and ‘86, at the Semaphore Gallery. During the 1970s and 80s, Gorewitz screened his videos in alternative spaces including clubs, bars, and other non-art venues. An early video by Gorewitz was shown on the jumbo screen during halftime of a football game in the Seattle Kingdome as part of the ‘Art in Public Spaces’ series, and Gorewitz’s video Dance This Mess Around was shown at the New York City nightclub Hurrah. Works by the artist were also presented on WNYC’s video art program Videoville (1993).

Gorewitz’s videos were selected for the 1981, 1983, and 1987 editions of the Whitney Biennial. In a review of the 1983 Biennial, New York Times art critic Grace Glueck writes of the artist’s work, "Mr. Gorewitz takes us on a euphoric cross-country romp, in which trees, factories, street signs, railroad tracks, cars and other landscape furnishings are image-processed almost to abstraction, the rhythmic results enhanced by 'live' sounds and a rollicking score." Curator Lois Bianchi included videos by Gorewitz --along with other artists who helped pave the way for video art-- in the touring exhibition Video Transformations (1986-87) which was presented at museums across the U.S.

Gorewitz’s work was included in the historic exhibition The First Decade: Video From the E.A.I. Archives (2002) held at the Museum of Modern Art, New York with concurrent presentations at other venues throughout the city. In 2004, the artist’s work was featured in Urban Eden: Three Videos by New York Artists at New York’s Jewish Museum.

Documentaries 
While he was an artist in residence at the Bronx Museum, Gorewitz was commissioned by the Museum to produce a documentary about the celebrated Moroccan painter Mohamed Melehi whose retrospective opened at the Bronx Museum of the Arts in 1984. Gorewitz traveled to Morocco to capture Melehi’s "universe and iconography", creating an artful and informative documentary on the painter’s practice.

Gorewitz produced a documentary with Rachel Hadas and Edouard Eloi on the life of the Haitian painter Stivenson Magloire.

In 2019, Gorewitz wrote an essay for the Hopkins Review on the origins and future of video art.

Personal life 
Shalom Gorewitz lives and works in New York and Vermont. He is married to the poet Rachel Hadas.

Notable works 
Select titles by Shalom Gorewitz distributed by the Electronic Arts Intermix include:

 Travels (1979-1980) 28:05 min, color, sound
 U.S. Sweat (1982) 16:10 min, color, sound
 Dissonant Landscapes (1984-86) 14:39 min, color, sound 
 Subatomic Babies (1983) 8:07 min, color, sound
 Promised Land (1990) 7:16 min, color, sound
 Melehi 1984, 25:10 min, color, sound
 A Conversation with Robert Longo (1984) 11:17 min color, sound

References

External links 
 http://www.vasulka.org/archive/Institutions2/AntholFilmArch/Vol1No3Bulletin.pdf
 http://www.experimentaltvcenter.org/sites/default/files/history/pdf/AnconaGorewitz_74.pdf
 https://monoskop.org/images/a/a6/Art_Journal_45_3_Video_The_Reflexive_Medium.pdf
 http://archives.getty.edu:30008/getty_images/digitalresources/2006m7_lbma/2006m7_lbma_exhibitionchron.pdf
 http://pdf.oac.cdlib.org/pdf/getty/spcoll/2014.M.6.pdf
 https://openvault.wgbh.org/catalog/V_3ACCE04B017440119A6C68936026B3A1
 https://assets.moma.org/documents/moma_master-checklist_327237.pdf?_ga=2.142047152.301614984.1623784951-999454174.1622755695
 https://www.si.edu/object/siris_sil_402017

American video artists
American contemporary artists
1949 births
Living people